Lucie Clayton College was founded by Sylvia Lucie Golledge in 1928 as a modelling agency and finishing school. It was bought by Leslie Kark who owned a successful model directory. It became Britain's top modelling agency during the 1950s and 1960s with Evelyn Gordine as the principal. Gordine (later Kark) was the business's public face using the name "Lucie Clayton".

Later History
Sylvia Lucie Golledge founded the organisation in 1928 as a modelling agency and finishing school. It had offices in Oxford Street. It was bought by Leslie Kark who owned a successful model directory named "Model". Kark's personal assistant Evelyn Gordine became the principal. Another employee in the office was Muriel Spark (before she was full-time novelist). Gordine used the name "Lucie Clayton" as her business name.

In 1956 the owner, Leslie, and the Principal, Evelyn, married and it was the Kark's who ran the business. Modelling became a higher status profession in Britain and the business moved to 66 New Bond Street.

The modelling agency closed in the late 1970s but the school now prepared their charges for " the Season". During the 1960s the alumni of the school included Sandra Paul, Celia Hammond and Joanna Lumley, who actually had careers modelling. Many of the student's did not expect to enter a modelling career and the business became a de facto finishing school.

In the early 1990s, Lucie Clayton reinvented itself as a secretarial and business college. The courses ranged from a few days up to a full year and included skills such as shorthand to IT to budgeting, marketing, public relations, law and personal development. Along the way, students may pick up the odd City & Guilds or London Chamber of Commerce & Industry professional qualification. At the end of the course they left with Lucie Clayton's certificate. The list of employers associated with the college includes Amanda Wakeley, Arthur Andersen, Hermes, JWT, the BBC, Vogue, and Schroders.

In 2007, Lucie Clayton College merged with two secretarial colleges, Queen's College and St James's College, to form Quest Business Training. Today it is known as "Quest Professional" and it has moved to Grosvenor Gardens. Lucie Clayton House in South Kensington, London was converted into seven serviced apartments.

Notable faculty

Evelyn Kark - Principal of the agency
Jean Broke-Smith - head-teacher in Ladette to Lady.

Notable alumni
Jemma Kidd - countess, make up artist, model
Fiona Campbell-Walter - model, socialite
Anne Dunhill - novelist, translator, and granddaughter of Alfred Dunhill
Celia Hammond - campaigner and founder of Celia Hammond Animal Trust
Joanna Lumley - actress, former model
Pippa Bennett-Warner - actress
Paulene Stone - Vogue cover girl
Samantha Juste - Top of the Pops TV presenter
Sandra Howard - novelist, wife of Michael Howard
Maripaz Jaramillo - Colombian visual artist.
Vicki Hodge - actress and model.
Lorna McDonald - former model
Jean Shrimpton - model, actress
Carole White - model and founder of Premier Model Management
Nuala Quinn-Barton - model, film producer and mother of actress Mischa Barton
Tania Mallet - model, actress
Gillian Tett - financial journalist

References

Educational institutions established in 1928
Finishing schools
1928 establishments in the United Kingdom